Red August, originally meaning August 1966 of the Cultural Revolution, is a term used to indicate a series of massacres in Beijing which mainly took place during the period. According to the official statistics in 1980, from August to September in 1966, a total of 1,772 people—including teachers and principals of many schools—were killed in Beijing by Red Guards; in addition, 33,695 homes were ransacked and 85,196 families were forced to leave the city. The killing by the Red Guards also made an impact on several rural districts of Beijing, causing the "Daxing Massacre", for example, during which 325 people were killed from August 27 to September 1 in Daxing District of Beijing. The oldest killed during the Daxing Massacre was 80 years old, while the youngest was only 38 days old; 22 families were wiped out. According to official statistics published on 7 November 1985, the number of beatings and deaths during the Red August was 10,275. 

On August 18, 1966, Mao Zedong met with Song Binbin, a leader of the Red Guards, on Tiananmen of Beijing, which greatly encouraged the Red Guards who then started their massive killing in the city and destroyed the "Four Olds" at the same time. Methods of slaughter during the Red August included beating, whipping, strangling, trampling, boiling, beheading and so on; in particular, the method used to kill most infants and children was knocking them against the ground or slicing them in half. Many people, including the notable writer Lao She, committed suicide after being persecuted. During the massacres, Mao Zedong publicly opposed any government intervention to the students' movement, and Xie Fuzhi, the Minister of Ministry of Public Security, instructed police and public security organs to protect the Red Guards instead of arresting them. However, the situation had grown out of control by the end of August 1966, forcing the Central Committee of the Chinese Communist Party (CCP) and Chinese government to take multiple interventions that gradually brought the massacre to an end.

The Red August of Beijing is regarded as the origin of Red Terror in the Chinese Cultural Revolution, instigating Red Guards' movement in multiple cities including Shanghai, Guangzhou, Nanjing and Xiamen, where local political leaders, intellectuals, teachers and members of the Five Black Categories were persecuted and even killed by the Red Guards. There has been comparison between the date "18 August 1966", which was the crucial moment of the Red August, with the Kristallnacht, which was the prelude of Nazi Germany's Holocaust. In addition, the Red August along with the subsequent massacres across China during the Cultural Revolution has been compared to the Nanjing Massacre conducted by the Japanese military during the Second Sino-Japanese War.

History of the massacre

Historical background 

On May 16, 1966, Cultural Revolution began in mainland, China. On August 5, Bian Zhongyun, the first vice principal of the Experimental High School Attached to Beijing Normal University, was beaten to death by Red Guards and was the first education worker in Beijing killed by the Red Guards.

Massacre in Beijing 
On August 18, 1966, Mao Zedong met with Song Binbin, a leader of the Red Guards, on Tiananmen of Beijing, where Mao asked Song if the "Bin" in her given name was the same Chinese character as that in Chinese Chengyu "Wen Zhi Bin Bin (文质彬彬)"; upon receiving confirmation, Mao commented that, “Yao Wu Ma (要武嘛)”, meaning "(you'd) better fight". After this meeting, the morale of the Red Guards was boosted significantly, triggering their massive slaughter in Beijing. In particular, on August 25, 1966, thousands of Red Guards started a week-long massacre in Langan Market of the Chongwen District. At the same time, the Red Guards began to destroy the "Four Olds". A total of 4,922 historic sites were ruined.

On August 22, 1966, Mao approved a document from the Ministry of Public Security, ordering "do not use police force—no exception—to intervene or suppress the movement of revolutionary students". The next day, Mao gave a talk at a Work Conference of the Central Committee of CCP, publicly backing the students' movement and opposing any intervention to the "Cultural Revolution of students":In my view, Peking is not all that chaotic. The students held a meeting of 100,000 and then captured the murderers. This caused some panic. Peking is too gentle. Appeals have been issued, [but after all] there are very few hooligans. Stop interfering for the time being. It is still too early to say anything definite about the reorganization of the centre of the [Youth] League; let us wait four months. Decisions taken hurriedly can do only harm. Work teams were dispatched in a hurry; the left was struggled against in a hurry; meetings of 100,000 were called in a hurry; appeals were issued in a hurry; opposition to the new municipal [party] committee of Peking was said, in a hurry, to be tantamount to an opposition to the [party] Centre. Why is it impermissible to oppose K? I have issued a big character poster myself, ‘Bombard the Headquarters!’ Some problems have to be settled soon. For instance, the workers, peasants, and soldiers should not interfere with the students’ great Cultural Revolution. Let the students go into the street. What is wrong with their writing big-character posters or going into the street? Let foreigners take pictures. They take shots to show aspects of our backward tendencies. But it does not matter. Let the imperialists make a scandal about us.On August 26, Xie Fuzhi, the Minister of Ministry of Public Security, also ordered to protect the Red Guards and not arrest them; he stated that it was not incorrect for the Red Guards to beat "bad people", and it was fine if the "bad people" were killed. The next day, the "Daxing Massacre" occurred in Daxing District of Beijing. While meeting with the heads of several provincial public security systems, Xie reiterated his points that the killing by Red Guards was none of their business and it would be a mistake if the public security was to arrest the Red Guards.

The end of the massacre 

By the end of August 1966, the situation had grown out of control, forcing the Central Committee of CCP and the Chinese government to take multiple interventions, which gradually brought the massacre to an end. On September 5, People's Daily published an article (用文斗, 不用武斗), calling for an end to the combat and massacre.

Nevertheless, millions of Red Guards continued to arrive in Beijing to see Mao Zedong at Tiananmen square on several occasions including September 15, October 1 and so on.

The slaughter

Methods of killing 
During the Red August, methods of slaughter used by the Red Guards included beating, whipping, strangling, trampling, boiling, beheading and so on. In particular, the method used to kill most infants and children was knocking them against the ground or slicing them in half.

Death toll 

 According to official statistics published in 1980, from August to September in 1966, a total of 1,772 people—including teachers and principals of many schools—were killed in Beijing by Red Guards; in addition, 33,695 homes were ransacked and 85,196 families were forced to leave Beijing. 
 In "Daxing Massacre", 325 people were killed from August 27 to September 1 in Daxing District of Beijing. Even though most researchers think that the number of deaths in Daxing massacre was already counted in Beijing's total tally (i.e., 1,772), some researchers disagree and argue that the number of deaths in rural districts such as Daxing and Changping were not counted in Beijing's municipal data.
 According to official statistics published in 1985, the death toll during the Red August was 10,275; in addition, 92,000 homes were ransacked and 125,000 families were forced to leave Beijing.

Aftermath and influence 

The Red August of Beijing is regarded as the origin of Red Terror in the Chinese Cultural Revolution. Some of the Red Guards from Beijing No.6 High School even wrote "Long Live Red Terror!" on the wall with the blood of their victims.

The Red August instigated the movement of Red Guards in multiple cities of China, including Shanghai, Guangzhou, Nanjing and Xiamen, where local political leaders, intellectuals, teachers and members of the Five Black Categories were persecuted and even killed by the Red Guards. For instance, on September 15, 1966, eleven Red Guards from Beijing Foreign Studies University went to Shanghai and teamed up with Red Guards from Shanghai Foreign Language School, chanting "Long Live Red Terror" and persecuting 31 teachers in total.

There has been comparison between the date "18 August 1966", which was the key point during the Red August, and the Kristallnacht, which was the prelude of Nazi Germany's Holocaust. Moreover, the Red August along with the subsequent massacres across China during the Cultural Revolution has also been compared to the Nanjing Massacre conducted by the Japanese military during the Second Sino-Japanese War.

See also 

 Red Terror
Five Black Categories
Four Olds
 Mass killings under communist regimes
List of massacres in China
Daxing Massacre
Mao Zedong's cult of personality

References 

Massacres in China
Political controversies in China
Political repression in China
1966 in Asia
1966 in China
1960s in Beijing
Man-made disasters in China
History of Beijing
Massacres committed by the People's Republic of China